The Tedei, otherwise known as the Thirrily, are an Aboriginal Australian people of Western Australia. They are a branch of the Yingkarta.

Country
Tedei land consisted of some  extending from the east coast of Shark Bay through to the Wooramel River valley's headwaters as far as Pimbie, Carey Downs and the vicinity of Towrana. It included the coastal area north of Yaringa.  inland to the headwaters, north only to Pimbie. Their limits were defined as a day's walk from either bank of the Wooramel.

People
The Tedei were once classified as an autonomous tribe. The work of linguist Peter Austin points to the conclusion that they, the Tedei/Thirrily, were actually a dialect division of the Yingkarta, together with the Mandi tribe.

Social organisation
The Tedei did not practice circumcision.

Alternative names
 Tjoki
 Choekie
 Chockie

Notes

Citations

Sources

Aboriginal peoples of Western Australia
Gascoyne